Conolaelaps is a genus of mites in the family Laelapidae.

Species
 Conolaelaps coniferus (Canestrini, 1884)

References

Laelapidae